White-eye coronavirus HKU16 is a species of coronavirus in the genus Deltacoronavirus.

References

Deltacoronaviruses